In telecommunications, an interface standard is a standard that describes one or more functional characteristics (such as code conversion, line assignments, or protocol compliance) or physical characteristics (such as electrical, mechanical, or optical characteristics) necessary to allow the exchange of information between two or more (usually different) systems or pieces of equipment. Communications protocols are an example. 

An interface standard may include operational characteristics and acceptable levels of performance. 

In the military community, interface standards permit command and control functions to be performed using communication and computer systems.

Telephones
There are many interface standards between analog telephone central office equipment and customer-premises equipment. Single voice paths generally include analog audio connections, either a two-wire circuit or four-wire circuit plus signaling paths to indicate call progress and status information, such as ringing, answer supervision, etc. Some of the known interface types are:
 FXO foreign exchange office
 FXS foreign exchange station
 DPO dial pulse originate
 DPT dial pulse terminate
 E and M signaling
 KS Kewlstart
 Loop start
 Ground start

See also 
 European Telecommunications Standards Institute

References 
 

Telecommunications standards